The 2014 FIFA Club World Cup final was the final match of the 2014 FIFA Club World Cup, a football tournament hosted by Morocco. It was the 11th final of the FIFA Club World Cup, a tournament organised by FIFA between the winners of the six continental confederations, as well as the host nation's league champions.

The final was contested between Spanish club Real Madrid, representing UEFA as the reigning champions of the UEFA Champions League, and Argentine club San Lorenzo, representing CONMEBOL as the reigning champions of the Copa Libertadores. It was played at the Stade de Marrakech in Marrakesh on 20 December 2014. The Spanish club won the match 2–0 and won their first FIFA Club World Cup title, and their fourth world club title counting the 1960, 1998 and 2002 Intercontinental Cups, equalling Milan's record.

Background

Real Madrid
Real Madrid qualified for the tournament as winners of the 2013–14 UEFA Champions League, following a 4–1 extra time win against Atlético Madrid in the final. This was Real Madrid's second time competing in the tournament, after finishing fourth in the inaugural tournament in 2000. They have played five times in the Intercontinental Cup, the predecessor of the FIFA Club World Cup, with three wins (1960, 1998, 2002) and two losses (1966, 2000). They reached the final after defeating Mexican club Cruz Azul in the semi-finals.

San Lorenzo
San Lorenzo qualified for the tournament as winners of the 2014 Copa Libertadores, following a 2–1 aggregate win against Nacional in the final. This was San Lorenzo's first time competing in the tournament. They reached the final after defeating New Zealand club Auckland City in the semi-finals.

Route to the final

Match details

See also
Real Madrid CF in international football competitions

References

External links
FIFA Club World Cup Morocco 2014, FIFA.com

Final
2014
Real Madrid CF matches
San Lorenzo de Almagro matches
2014–15 in Spanish football
FIFA
Sports competitions in Marrakesh
21st century in Marrakesh